Menahem Degani (18 August 1927 – 23 November 2018) was an Israeli basketball player. He competed in the men's tournament at the 1952 Summer Olympics.

References

1927 births
2018 deaths
Sportspeople from Tel Aviv
Israeli men's basketball players
Olympic basketball players of Israel
Basketball players at the 1952 Summer Olympics